Grigore Belostecinic (born 7 January 1960) is a politician from Moldova. He served as a member of the Parliament of Moldova and rector of the Academy of Economic Studies of Moldova.

References

External links 
 Belostecinic Grigore
 Parlamentul Republicii Moldova

1960 births
Living people
Liberal Democratic Party of Moldova MPs
Moldovan MPs 2010–2014
Titular members of the Academy of Sciences of Moldova

Recipients of the Order of Honour (Moldova)